Harry Simon may refer to:

Harry Simon (boxer) (born 1972), Namibian boxer
Harry Simon (sport shooter) (1873–1932), American sport shooter
Harry Simon (sinologist)

See also
Henry Simon (disambiguation)